LeeLee Morrison-Henry  (born 2 October 1960) is a Canadian freestyle skier. She was born in Norwood, Massachusetts, United States. She competed at the 1992 Winter Olympics, in women's moguls.

References

External links 
 

1960 births
People from Norwood, Massachusetts
Living people
Canadian female freestyle skiers
Olympic freestyle skiers of Canada
Freestyle skiers at the 1992 Winter Olympics